Drexel 4175, also known by an inscription on its cover, "Ann Twice, Her Book" or by the inscription on its first leaf, "Songs unto the violl and lute," is a music manuscript commonplace book. It is a noted source of songs from English Renaissance theatre, considered to be "indispensable to the rounding-out of our picture of seventeenth-century English song." It is believed to contain the original music of the song "Come Away, Hecket" as heard in Thomas Middleton's play The Witch which was used in William Shakespeare's Macbeth. Belonging to the New York Public Library, the manuscript forms part of the Music Division's Drexel Collection, located at the New York Public Library for the Performing Arts. Following traditional library practice, its name is derived from its call number.

Dating

John Stafford Smith suggested a date "about the year 1620" for the two songs ("Ist for a grace" and "You herralds of Mrs hart") he printed in his compilation Musica Antiqua. Duckles mistakenly took this date to refer to the entire manuscript, an assumption continued by Cutts. In the introduction to the facsimile edition, Jorgens emended this misinterpretation, stating that scholars date the manuscript between 1620 and 1630. She noted a problem posed by the song "Like to the damask rose": If the composer attribution of Henry Lawes is accepted, the appearance of this song in a manuscript from the 1620s pushes back the composer's reputation ten years before to most musicologists' understanding of his career. If the attribution is incorrect, then that casts doubt on the manuscript's many attributions.

Provenance
Issues of provenance for Drexel 4175 begin with its cover.  Its inscription "Ann Twice, Her Book" would indicate that one of the previous owners was Ann Twice, although no information has surfaced on who she was. The first page has two inscriptions on it; the first is "Songs unto the violl and Lute."  Beneath that is the note: "my Cosen Twice Leffte this Booke with me when shee went to Broisil which is to be returne to her AGhaine when she Come to Glost." Based on this note, musicologist Ian Spink concluded that Ann Twice lived in Gloucester around 1620 (the date based on John Stafford Smith's attributions). Assuming the songs were copied for her use, Spink surmised that Twice must have been a good singer whose music master (the copyist of the manuscript) was "a man of taste." At some point she traveled to Bristol where she left the manuscript with her cousin, the writer of this inscription (whose name is unknown).  The whereabouts of the manuscript are then unknown for nearly two centuries until Smith included selections in his collection Musica Antiqua.  In that publication Smith included a note referring to himself as the manuscript's owner. Smith actually marked the manuscript to indicate those songs to be included in Musica Antiqua.

It is not known whether Edward Francis Rimbault purchased the volume directly from the sale of Smith's estate, but it eventually came into his possession. Rimbault apparently lent the manuscript to Thomas Oliphant, cataloger of the British Museum (today the British Library).  Oliphant's letter was affixed to front of manuscript stating that Oliphant made several "memorandums" (pencil markings in the manuscript).  This letter is mentioned in the catalog of the Rimbault library auction, where it is listed as lot no. 1389 (the lot number can be seen penciled in on the first leaf).

After Rimbault's death in 1876 followed by the auction of his estate in 1877, the manuscript was one of about 600 lots purchased by Philadelphia-born financier Joseph W. Drexel, who had already amassed a large music library. Upon Drexel's death, he bequeathed his music library to The Lenox Library. When the Lenox Library merged with the Astor Library to become the New York Public Library, the Drexel Collection became the basis for one of its founding units, the Music Division. Today, Drexel 4175 is part of the Drexel Collection in the Music Division, now located at the New York Public Library for the Performing Arts at Lincoln Center.

Physical state

The manuscript measures .

According to the manuscript's table of contents, there were originally 58 songs, including blank spaces intended for songs 59 and 60.  The manuscript's numbering left out numbers 38 and 45.  At some point a number of songs were removed so that, today, there are only 25 leaves containing 28 songs. At least one song appears to have been removed since the time of Smith's ownership. "Rest awhile you cruell cares" (no. 39 of the table below) was noted by Smith and Oliphant, but is not present in the manuscript.  Cutts questioned why it was removed, surmising the reason might have been for the song on its verso, "Haue you seen ye"?

Due to its poor physical state, Drexel 4175 was rebound by conservators Carolyn Horton & Associates in 1981.  The cover was separated and a new binding with marbled covers supplied.

Content
Of the 28 songs currently contained in the manuscript, six are from plays or masques (nos. 24, 29, 40, 43, 47, 52).  Seven of the missing songs are also from dramatic works  (nos. 2, 4, 5, 13, 19, 30 and 38).  Seventeen of the songs have a simple bass accompaniment, ten have accompaniment notated in lute tablature (nos. 40–42, 50–51, 53–57) and one song lacks accompaniment (no. 58). Two songs are duplicates: No. 24 (no. xxiv) "Cupid is Venus only ioy" is repeated at no. 54 (no. lvi) and no. 40 (no. xli) "Deare doe not your faire beuty wronge" is repeated at no. 49 (li).

In its repetition at no. 49 (li), "Deare doe not your faire beuty wronge" is the only song to have a composer attribution, that of Robert Johnson. Johnson is represented by several songs in the manuscript:  "O let vs howle" (no. 4 from The Duchess of Malfi), "Tell mee dearest what is loue" (no. 43 from The Captain), "Haue you seene the bright lilly growe" (no. 47 from The Devil is an Ass), and "Heare yee ladyes yt" (formerly part of the manuscript as no. 19 from Valentinian).  Cutts notes that all these plays were produced by King's Men, the repertory company to which Shakespeare belonged and for which Johnson wrote music from 1608-1617.

Smith appears to have been the first to publish anything from the manuscript.  He included six songs from it in his 1812 publication Musica Antiqua: "Come away, come away hecket" (no. 52), "Though your stragnes freet my hart" (no. 25), "Deare doe not your faire beuty wronge" (nos. 40 and 49), "Ist for a grace or ist for some mislike" (no. 20), "You herralds of Mrs hart" (no. 56), and "When I sit as iudge betweene vertue and loues princely dame" (no. 26).

Smith apparently took particular interest in "Come away hecket" (no. 52), going as far as to note that it was the music used in Thomas Middleton's play The Witch. Cutts took great interest in the song, surmising that the song was probably in the possession of a member of the King's Men, which is how it is quoted in the 1623 folio of Shakespeare's Macbeth. Comparing it to another "witch" song known to have been composed by Johnson, "Come away ye lady gay", Cutts feels that similar attributes of compositional technique and verbal rhythm suggest that Johnson also composed "Come away hecket." Cutts used this evidence to underscore his theory that this song was an inspiration for the witches' scene in Macbeth.

Based on the titles of the missing songs provided in the table of contents, Cutts was able to make observations (sometimes extensive) on the content, when possible noting their existence in different contemporaneous manuscript collections.

Of those who have studied the manuscript, none have made more than fleeting comments on the manuscript's non-musical content, consisting of recipes and poems.  Curiously, the recipes have been written upside down in comparison to the remainder of the book.  Duckles specifically mentioned recipes for carpe pye, pigeon pye, marrow pudding and French bread.

List of contents
This list is based on the table of contents and includes numbering from Jorgens and the numbering used in the manuscript. Those songs not in the manuscript are indicated in the column as "Not in ms." with a row color of silver. Most of the attributions and remarks were provided by Cutts.

Bibliography

Facsimile

Notes

External links

Drexel 4175: Songs unto the violl and lute (digitized images)
NYPL catalog record (Classic catalog)
RISM OPAC entry of Drexel 4175
Musica Antiqua

17th-century manuscripts
Baroque music manuscript sources
Books on English music
English manuscripts
Manuscripts in the New York Public Library
Music anthologies